Rainbow Sign is a studio album from American jazz musician Ron Miles, it is his first album on a major label, Blue Note Records, released on October 9, 2020. It has received positive reviews from critics. It is also his final studio album, released two years prior to his death in March 2022.

Recording
The album was recorded while Miles cared for his dying father in mid-2018 and reunited him with a band that helped record his previous album I Am a Man.

Critical reception
The editorial staff of AllMusic Guide gave the album four out of five stars, with reviewer Thom Jurek noting how Miles blends "polytonal modal music, blues, gospel, post-bop, and pop". Kevin Whitehead of Fresh Air praises the dream-like quality of the musicians and their ability to work together to realize Miles' music and he notes the influence of pop music. In The Times, Chris Pearson gave the album four out of five stars, also pointing out the interplay of the musicians. Writing in Financial Times, Mike Hobart also scored Rainbow Sign four out of five stars for the "clean lines, close-knit interplay and an understated pulse" on the album.

Track listing
All songs written by Ron Miles
"Like Those Who Dream"– 15:56
"Queen of the South"– 4:20
"Average"– 11:12
"Rainbow Sign"– 7:08
"The Rumor"– 4:30
"Custodian of the New"– 7:49
"This Old Man"– 6:57
"Binder"– 6:01
"A Kind Word"– 5:57

Personnel
Ron Miles– cornet, band leader, production
Brian Blade– drums
Bill Frisell– guitar
Jason Moran– piano, photography
Thomas Morgan– double bass

Technical personnel
Lurah Blade– photography
Colin Bricker– engineering, mixing, production
Greg Calbi– mastering
Monica Frisell– photography
Todd Gallopo– art direction, design
Thomas Krebs– photography
Kevin Lee– assistance
Owen Mulholland– assistance
Hans Wendl– project management

See also
List of 2020 albums

References

External links

Entry at Jazz Music Archives

2020 albums
Blue Note Records albums
Ron Miles albums
Jazz-pop albums
Pop albums by American artists